The following is a list of bird species endemic or near-endemic to southern Africa (South Africa, Lesotho, Eswatini, Namibia, Botswana, Zimbabwe, and southern Mozambique).

 Grey-winged francolin, Scleroptila africanus
 Orange River francolin, Scleroptila levaillantoides
 Red-billed spurfowl (red-billed francolin), Pternistes adspersus
 Cape spurfowl (Cape francolin), Pternistes capensis
 Natal spurfowl (Natal francolin), Pternistes natalensis
 South African shelduck, Tadorna cana
 Cape shoveler, Anas smithii
 Fynbos buttonquail, Turnix hottentotta
 Knysna woodpecker, Campethera notata
 Ground woodpecker, Geocolaptes olivaceus
 Acacia pied barbet, Tricholaema leucomelas
 Monteiro's hornbill (Damara hornbill), Tockus monteiri
 Southern yellow-billed hornbill, Tockus leucomelas
 Bradfield's hornbill, Tockus bradfieldi
 White-backed mousebird, Colius colius
 Cape parrot, Poicephalus robustus
 Ruppell's parrot, Poicephalus rueppellii
 Rosy-faced lovebird, Agapornis roseicollis
 Bradfield's swift, Apus bradfieldi
 Knysna turaco, Tauraco corythaix
 Ludwig's bustard, Neotis ludwigii
 Red-crested korhaan, Eupodotis ruficrista
 Southern black korhaan (black bustard), Afrotis afra (Eupodotis afra)
 Northern black korhaan (white-quilled bustard), Afrotis afraoides (Eupodotis afraoides)
 Ruppell's korhaan, Eupodotis rueppellii
 Karoo korhaan, Eupodotis vigorsii
 Blue korhaan, Eupodotis caerulescens
 Blue crane, Anthropoides paradiseus
 Namaqua sandgrouse, Pterocles namaqua
 Double-banded sandgrouse, Pterocles bicinctus
 Burchell's sandgrouse, Pterocles burchelli
 Burchell's courser, Cursorius rufus
 Hartlaub's gull, Larus hartlaubii
 Cape vulture, Gyps coprotheres
 Black harrier, Circus maurus
 Southern pale chanting goshawk, Melierax canorus
 Forest buzzard, Buteo trizonatus
 Jackal buzzard, Buteo rufofuscus
 Crowned cormorant, Phalacrocorax coronatus
 Bank cormorant, Phalacrocorax neglectus
 Southern bald ibis, Geronticus calvus
 African penguin, Spheniscus demersus
 Southern tchagra, Tchagra tchagra
 Southern boubou, Laniarius ferrugineus
 Crimson-breasted shrike, Laniarius atrococcineus
 Bokmakierie, Telophorus zeylonus
 Olive bushshrike, Telophorus olivaceus
 White-tailed shrike, Lanioturdus torquatus
 Cape batis, Batis capensis
 Pririt batis, Batis pririt
 Southern white-crowned shrike, Eurocephalus anguitimens
 Cape rockjumper, Chaetops frenatus
 Drakensberg rockjumper, Chaetops aurantius
 Cape penduline tit, Anthoscopus minutus
 Carp's tit, Parus carpi
 Ashy tit, Parus cinerascens
 Grey tit, Parus afer
 African red-eyed bulbul, Pycnonotus nigricans
 Cape bulbul, Pycnonotus capensis
 Fairy flycatcher, Stenostira scita
 Rockrunner, Achaetops pycnopygius
 Cape grassbird, Sphenoeacus afer
 Victorin's warbler, Bradypterus victorini
 Karoo eremomela, Eremomela gregalis
 Knysna warbler, Bradypterus sylvaticus
 Barratt's warbler, Bradypterus barratti
 Black-faced babbler, Turdoides melanops
 Southern pied babbler, Turdoides bicolor
 Bush blackcap, Lioptilus nigricapillus
 Layard's tit-babbler, Parisoma layardi
 Chestnut-vented tit-babbler, Parisoma subcaeruleum
 Cape white-eye, Zosterops virens
 Orange River white-eye, Zosterops pallidus
 Grey-backed cisticola, Cisticola subruficapillus
 Rufous-winged cisticola, Cisticola galactotes
 Cloud cisticola, Cisticola textrix
 Black-chested prinia, Prinia flavicans
 Karoo prinia, Prinia maculosa
 Drakensberg prinia, Prinia hypoxantha
 Namaqua warbler, Phragmacia substriata
 Robert's warbler, Oreophilais robertsi
 Rufous-eared warbler, Malcorus pectoralis
 Rudd's apalis, Apalis ruddi
 Chirinda apalis, Apalis chirindensis
 Barred wren-warbler, Calamonastes fasciolatus
 Cinnamon-breasted warbler, Euryptila subcinnamomea
 Monotonous lark, Mirafra passerina
 Melodious lark, Mirafra cheniana
 Cape clapper lark, Mirafra apiata
 Eastern clapper lark, Mirafra fasciolata
 Sabota lark (incl. Bradfield's), Mirafra sabota
 Fawn-coloured lark, Calendulauda africanoides
 Rudd's lark, Heteromirafra ruddi
 Red lark, Certhilauda burra
 Karoo lark, Certhilauda albescens
 Barlow's lark, Certhilauda barlowi
 Dune lark, Certhilauda erythrochlamys
 Cape long-billed lark, Certhilauda curvirostris
 Agulhas long-billed lark, Certhilauda brevirostris
 Eastern long-billed lark, Certhilauda semitorquata
 Karoo long-billed lark, Certhilauda subcoronata
 Short-clawed lark, Certhilauda chuana
 Gray's lark, Ammomanes grayi
 Spike-heeled lark, Chersomanes albofasciata
 Black-eared sparrow-lark, Eremopterix australis
 Grey-backed sparrow-lark, Eremopterix verticalis
 Stark's lark, Eremalauda starki
 Pink-billed lark, Spizocorys conirostris
 Botha's lark, Spizocorys fringillaris
 Sclater's lark, Spizocorys sclateri
 Large-billed lark, Galerida magnirostris
 Cape rock thrush, Monticola rupestris
 Sentinel rock thrush, Monticola explorator
 Short-toed rock thrush, Monticola brevipes
 Karoo thrush, Turdus smithi
 Chat flycatcher, Bradornis infuscatus
 Marico flycatcher, Bradornis mariquensis
 Fiscal flycatcher, Sigelus silens
 White-throated robin-chat, Cossypha humeralis
 Chorister robin-chat, Cossypha dichroa
 Brown scrub robin, Cercotrichas signata
 Kalahari scrub robin, Cercotrichas paena
 Karoo scrub robin, Cercotrichas coryphaeus
 Herero chat, Namibornis herero
 Buff-streaked chat, Oenanthe bifasciata
 Mountain wheatear, Oenanthe monticola
 Sickle-winged chat, Cercomela sinuata
 Karoo chat, Cercomela schlegelii
 Tractrac chat, Cercomela tractrac
 Anteating chat, Myrmecocichla formicivora
 Boulder chat, Pinarornis plumosus
 Pale-winged starling, Onychognathus nabouroup
 Burchell's starling, Lamprotornis australis
 Pied starling, Spreo bicolor
 Gurney's sugarbird, Promerops gurneyi
 Cape sugarbird, Promerops cafer
 Orange-breasted sunbird, Anthobaphes violacea
 Southern double-collared sunbird, Cinnyris chalybea
 Greater double-collared sunbird, Cinnyris afra
 Neergaard's sunbird, Cinnyris neergaardi
 Dusky sunbird, Cinnyris fusca
 Great sparrow, Passer motitensis
 Cape sparrow, Passer melanurus
 Cape longclaw, Macronyx capensis
 Yellow-breasted pipit, Anthus chloris
 African rock pipit, Anthus crenatus
 Scaly-feathered finch, Sporopipes squamifrons
 Sociable weaver, Philetairus socius
 Cape weaver, Ploceus capensis
 Pink-throated twinspot, Hypargos margaritatus
 Swee waxbill, Estrilda melanotis
 Red-headed finch, Amadina erythrocephala
 Shaft-tailed whydah, Vidua regia
 Forest canary, Crithagra scotops
 Lemon-breasted canary, Crithagra citrinipectus
 Yellow canary, Crithagra flaviventris
 White-throated canary, Crithagra albogularis
 Protea canary, Crithagra leucoptera
 Cape siskin, Crithagra totta
 Drakensberg siskin, Crithagra symonsi
 Cape canary, Serinus canicollis
 Black-headed canary, Serinus alario
 Lark-like bunting, Emberiza impetuani
 Cape bunting, Emberiza capensis

References

Southern Africa